DJ Kicks: The Glimmers is a DJ mix album, mixed by The Glimmers (formerly The Glimmer Twins and Mo & Benoelie). It was released on 11 April 2005 on the Studio !K7 independent record label as part of the DJ-Kicks series.

Track listing
"Shack Up" – bis – 3:23
"Lovertits" – Peaches – 2:52
"Approach & Pass With Contact" – Big Two Hundred – 4:16
"I Want U (Dub)" – Dirty Mind – 4:06
"Heroine (DJ Kicks Mix)" – The Lotterboys – 3:32
"Can You Move" – Modern Romance – 3:09
"Disko Satisfaction" – Kerri Chandler – 3:25
"Get Down" – Connie Case – 3:20
"Everybody Get Down" – Deepstate II – 3:50
"Fix It Man (Marshall Jefferson Vocal Mix)" – Ragtyme – 2:32
"Kosmisk Klubbveld" – Lindstrøm & Prins Thomas – 3:50
"Feel Like I Feel (Sing Along)" – Kaos – 6:02
"Impi (Dub)" – Impi – 3:16
"The Groove Machine / The Boogie Train" – Hamilton Bohannon – 4:27
"Cassette (DJ Kicks) – The Glimmers – 5:39
"Feast Dub" – Two Lone Swordsmen – 3:48
"Kel's Vintage Thought (Out Hud Rmx)" – Magnetophone – 3:10
"I'm A Man" – Chicago – 7:49

References

External links 
DJ-Kicks website
Glimmer Twins on Deadfish.in

Glimmers, The
2005 compilation albums